The Gol-Gol River is the main tributary of Puyehue Lake in southern Chile. Gol-Gol River runs in an east-west direction between the volcanoes Puyehue-Cordón Caulle and Casablanca. Its catchment areas covers the whole area between these massifs from the Cardenal Antonio Samoré Pass to Puyehue Lake.

See also
 List of rivers of Chile

References 

Gol-Gol River
Rivers of Los Lagos Region